Parvocellular neurosecretory cells are small neurons that produce hypothalamic releasing and inhibiting hormones. The cell bodies of these neurons are located in various nuclei of the hypothalamus or in closely related areas of the basal brain, mainly in the medial zone of the hypothalamus. All or most of the axons of the parvocellular neurosecretory cells project to the median eminence, at the base of the brain, where their nerve terminals release the hypothalamic hormones. These hormones are then immediately absorbed into the blood vessels of the hypothalamo-pituitary portal system, which carry them to the anterior pituitary gland, where they regulate the secretion of hormones into the systemic circulation.


Types
The parvocellular neurosecretory cells include those that make:
 Thyrotropin-releasing hormone (TRH), which acts as the primary regulator of TSH and a regulator of prolactin
 Corticotropin-releasing hormone (CRH), which acts as the primary regulator of ACTH
 
 
 Neurotensin, which acts as a regulator of luteinizing hormone and prolactin

See also
 Magnocellular neurosecretory cell

References

Neuroendocrine cells
Neuroendocrinology
Human cells
Hypothalamus